A latch is a type of door or window fastener.

Latch may also refer to:

Technology
 Latch, a circuit used to store information, see Flip-flop (electronics)
 Index lock, a lock on a data-structure
 LATCH (Lower Anchors and Tethers for Children), a mounting system for child safety seats

Other uses
 Latch (breastfeeding), a breastfeeding baby's connection
 "Latch" (song), a 2012 song by Disclosure featuring Sam Smith

See also
 Latching relay, a relay with two relaxed states (bistable)
 Latching switch, a switch that maintains its state after being activated
 Latching (networking), in computer networking
 Laches (disambiguation)